James Edgar Harold Ward (born July 16, 1944) is a former professional American football quarterback. He played for the Baltimore Colts in 1967-1968 and for the Philadelphia Eagles in 1971. He attended Gettysburg College and was the only player in school history to be drafted.

References

1944 births
Living people
People from Gaithersburg, Maryland
Players of American football from Maryland
American football quarterbacks
Gettysburg Bullets football players
Baltimore Colts players
Philadelphia Eagles players
Gaithersburg High School alumni